Bankura is a city and a municipality in the state of West Bengal, India. It is the headquarters of the Bankura district.

Etymology
In the Mahabharata, Bankura was described as Suhmobhumi. The popularity of Manasa Puja, the worship of Snake-Goddess Manasa, shows this opinion might have some relevance. According to Nilkantha, a commentator of the Mahabharata, the words  (Sanskrit: suhma-bhūmi) and Rarh are synonymous.

Scholars differs in their opinion about the etymology of the name Bankura. In the words of the Kol-Mundas, orah or rah means habitation. Many places of Rarh have an added rah at the end of their names. One of the most influential gods of the district 6-Dharmathakur is called Bankura Roy. The name of the district may come from his name. Linguist Suniti Kumar Chatterjee thinks that the name came from the word banka (zig-zag), and its word-corruption banku, which means extremely beautiful, and he who must be worshiped. In 1979, the word “Bancoorah” was found in the map of Renal. In 1863, Gastrel referred this region as Bancoonda.

Bir Hambir was the 49th King of  Malla dynasty. Bir Bankura was one of his two sons. Raja Bir Hambir divided his kingdom into 22 tarafs or circles and gave one to his each son. Taraf Jaybelia fell to the lot of Bir Bankura. He developed a town in his taraf and the town was later named as 'Bankura' after its founder's name.

Geography

Location

Bankura district is located in the north western part of the state of West Bengal. It is a part of Bardhaman Division of the State and is included in the area known as "Rarh" in Bengal. The Damodar River flows along the Northern boundary of the district. Bankura district is bounded by Purba Bardhaman and Paschim Bardhman district in the north and east, Paschim Medinipur district in the south and Purilia to the west.

The Bankura Forest composes about 21% of the entire district. It has degraded in some areas due to overuse by humans.

Climate
Bankura has very hot climate in summer and moderate temperatures in winter. Rainfall occurs mostly between June to September and the annual amount is about 1500mm. Till 2020, the highest ever recorded temperature is 47.4 °C, on 8 May 1977. While the lowest was recorded on 9 January 2013, 4.8 °C. Bankura holds two state records. The record high temperature of February (39.3 °C) and in April (46.7 °C) are highest in West Bengal. 
Area overview
The map alongside shows the Bankura Sadar subdivision of Bankura district. Physiographically, this area is part of the Bankura Uplands in the west gradually merging with the Bankura-Bishnupur Rarh Plains in the north-east. The western portions are characterised by undulating terrain with many hills and ridges. The area is having a gradual descent from the Chota Nagpur Plateau. The soil is laterite red and hard beds are covered with scrub jungle and sal wood. Gradually it gives way to just uneven rolling lands but the soil continues to be lateritic. There are coal mines in the northern part, along the Damodar River. It is a predominantly rural area with 89% of the population living in rural areas and only 11% living in the urban areas.

Note: The map alongside presents some of the notable locations in the subdivision. All places marked in the map are linked in the larger full screen map.

Demographics

In the 2011 census, Bankura city had a population of  137,386 of which 69,843 were males and 67,543 were females, giving a sex ratio of 967. The literacy rate was  86.12% and there were 12,148 children 0–6 years old

Civic administration
Police stations
Bankura police station has jurisdiction over Bankura municipality, Bankura I and Bankura II CD Blocks. The area covered is 439 km2. There are 3 town outposts and an outpost at Rajagram.

Bankura Sadar Division woman police station, started in 2014, has jurisdiction over whole of Bankura Sadar subdivision.

 Climate 
Bankura has a tropical monsoon climate (Koppen Am).
\
Net cultivable area of the district is 4.30 lakh (430,000) hectares. 

Transport
Bankura Junction railway station is managed by the South Eastern Railways and is on the Adra-Midnapore rail route. It is in Bankura city. Bhubaneswar Rajdhani Express, Rupashi Bangla Express, Aranyak Express, Puri-New Delhi (Nandan Kanan) Superfast Express, Ernakulam-Patna Express, Howrah-LTT Samarsata Express and Purulia-Howrah Express pass through this station. It is the originating and terminating station of Bankura Damodar Railway which will connect to Howrah-Bardhaman Chord section. Computerized reservation facility is available. Going towards north-west, Adra Junction Railway Station is the nearest main station and moving to south, Midnapore Railway Station is the major station next to Bankura.

The Bankura Junction railway station and bridge over Dhaleshwari River were built by Gujarati Railway Contractors of the town Jeewan Gangji Savaria and Lalji Raja Vadher in 1900 working for Bengal Nagpur Railway.

National Highway 14 (India) running from Morgam (in Murshidabad district) to Kharagpur (in Paschim Medinipur district), State Highway 9 (West Bengal) running from Durgapur (in Paschim Bardhaman district) to Nayagram (in Jhargram district) and State Highway 5 (West Bengal) running from Rupnarayanpur (in Bardhaman district) to Junput (in Purba Medinipur) pass through Bankura. NH 14 links Bankura to NH 12 and NH 16. Both NH 14 and SH 9 link Bankura to NH 19 (Grand Trunk Road).

Tourism 
Bankura has gained much popularity among tourists hailing from India. The place has a rich cultural and traditional heritage. It is known for its paintings, music and other arts. The place has contributed toward modern Bengal art and architecture 
The tourist spots can be divided into four zones.

Eastern Zone 

Bishnupur is a tourist spot of Bankura district. It is 152 km from Kolkata and 34 km from Bankura Town. This place has a historical importance as it was the capital of Mallabhum. It is known for terracotta temples and Baluchari sarees. It is popular for classical music dalmadal and painting. There are approximately 16 temples, most of which are made in the decade of Mallaraja. Temples of Bishnupur include Jor Mandir, Rasmancha, Radhamadhab Temple, Kalachand Temple, Madan Mohan Temple, Radha-Gobinda Temple and Shyam Ray Temple.
Joyrambati is 98 km from Kolkata. It is a holy place as it was the birthplace of Sree Sree Maa Sarada Devi. Temple of Singha Bahani Devi and Mayerepukur are also visiting sites.

Western Zone 
Susunia Hill is also a tourist spot of Bankura District. It is 50 km from Bisnupur and 21 km from Bankura town . It is known for a natural spring and a historical stone engraving .
Biharinath Hill is the tallest (448 m) of Bankura District. It is in the northwestern edge of the district. It is 57 km from Bankura Town. It was an ancient centre of Jainism, and known for its natural environment. Biharinath has hills, dense forest, water bodies, river Damodar, and a temple of Lord Shiva.

South Zone 
 
 Mukutmanipur is a tourist spot of Bankura District. It is 55 km from Bankura District headquarters. It is the second biggest earthen dam of India.
 Jhilimili has a dense natural forest. It lies 70 km from Bankura Town.

Northern Zone 
Durgapur Barrage
Gangdua Dam
Koro Pahar (Amar Kanan)

Healthcare
Bankura Sammilani Medical College and Hospital is the most important hospital of the district equipped with all major departments and diagnostic facilities.
Bankura Sub-Divisional Hospital is an important hospital. It has a paediatric ward, blood test and OT.

 Notable people 

 Balaram Mukhopadhyay (born 1973), carbohydrate chemist and professor
Maniklal Sinha (1916–1994), archaeologist, writer, founder of Acharya Jogesh Chandra Pura Kirti Bhavan (museum) and Bangiya Sahitya Parishad- Bishnupr branch.

See also
 Culture of Bankura district

References

External links
 
 "Bankura" (archived link). National Informatics Centre.
Cities and towns in Bankura district
 
Cities in West Bengal